Rao Bagh  is a town in Chiniot District, Punjab. It is located away  from the city of Chiniot  towards Lahore.

Populated places in Chiniot District